Elsham may refer to:

Elsham (organisation), an Indonesian human rights non-governmental organization
Elsham, Lincolnshire, England, a village and civil parish